The 1981 Buffalo State Bengals football team represented Buffalo State College as an independent during the 1981 NCAA Division III football season. They were led by second-year head coach Les Dugan and played their home games at Coyer Field. The Bengals offense scored 77 points while the defense allowed 135 points.

Schedule

References

Buffalo State
Buffalo State Bengals football seasons
Buffalo State Bengals football